Odwin Gilkes (born 26 January 1960) is a Barbadian cricketer. He played in one List A match for the Barbados cricket team in 1984/85.

See also
 List of Barbadian representative cricketers

References

External links
 

1960 births
Living people
Barbadian cricketers
Barbados cricketers